Dr Satendra Singh is a medical doctor at the University College of Medical Sciences and Guru Tegh Bahadur Hospital, Delhi. A physiologist by profession, he contracted poliomyelitis at the age of nine months but went on to complete a Bachelor of Medicine, Bachelor of Surgery from Ganesh Shankar Vidyarthi Memorial Medical College, Kanpur and later on Doctor of Medicine in Physiology. He is the first ever Indian to win the prestigious Henry Viscardi Achievement Awards given to extraordinary leaders in global disability community. He is a noted disability activist especially for his sustained efforts in making public places accessible for disabled persons for which he was conferred National Award by President of India.  He is also the first Indian to be awarded the MacLean Center for Clinical Medical Ethics fellowship at the University of Chicago. Singh had been involved in the synthesis of epibatidine analogues, leading to the discovery of epiboxidine. In contrast to RTI-336, which positions a 3-tolyl group on the isoxazole ring to the DAT receptor, a phenyl group was too sterically encumbered to be tolerated in the case of the nicotinic receptors. Although aromatic moieties seem to be tolerated at the mGlu5 receptor in the case of ADX-47273.

Disability activism 
He advocated for not only his but other disabled doctors' rights. He also brought into the open the discrimination by UPSC which disallowed doctors with disabilities to apply for various Central Health Services (CHS) posts. He himself was rejected in 2014 but fought and was later allowed to appear for the interview. In 2013, his application was again rejected when he highlighted that the same discrimination was also present for the other posts. He was allowed to apply in a quick intervention. His RTI revealed that doctors with disabilities are not considered eligible for specialist CHS posts in teaching, non-teaching as well as public health specialist cadres. Undeterred, he complained again and requested the health ministry to allow all eligible doctors with disability to apply for these posts. His single-handed relentless fight for justice over four years ultimately forced Health Ministry to unlock 1,674 specialist central posts for disabled doctors.

Disability Rights in Medical Curriculum 

He sparked an international conversation about a lack of disability rights in the medical curriculum and then led an international collaboration to frame disability competencies for health professions educators. In sustained judicial advocacy with the Medical Council of India, he successfully led to the incorporation of disability rights as a human rights approach in the new medical curriculum in India. This was a significant moment as disability competencies promoting equity and social justice are now a mandatory part of the Indian medical curriculum unlike optional as seen globally in other medical curricula.

Challenged unfair guidelines of Medical Council of India 

He filed writ petition in the Supreme Court of India and led successful advocacy of doctors with disabilities to the Central Government to bring amendments in the controversial MCI guidelines lifting the bar on admission of candidates with specified disabilities.

Accessibility of all the medical institutions in India 
As a result of his petition to the Court of the Chief Commissioner for Persons with Disabilities, under Ministry of Social Justice and Empowerment, Government of India instructed Medical Council of India to issue directives to all the medical institutions in India to be disabled-friendly. Despite these efforts, most medical institutions have yet to comply with the directions. His black armband protest on the United Nations' International Day of Persons with Disabilities in 2012 led authorities to construct ramps outside all the hostels at his medical college.

Disabled-friendly polling booths 
He played an integral role of whistleblower to raise the issue of problems faced by voters with disabilities before and during the 2013 Delhi Legislative Assembly election through Right to Information.  He also wrote to the election commission as well as the Chief Justice of India to allow disabled voters to vote again before declaration of final results.  His RTI on fourth National Voters' Day revealed how Election Commission of India was caught unprepared to enfranchise electors with disability. It showed violation of Supreme Court orders of 2004 to empower voters with disabilities. After the expose Chief Electoral Office, Delhi involved him in making elections in Delhi disabled-friendly. Not only did he sensitise the election officers on how to help electors with disability but he also helped in setting up a disability registration helpline. His sustained efforts led to making election booths across the capital accessible to disabled and elderly voters. Further, on his petition the disability court warned the Election Commission of India to make its website disabled friendly. He got State and National Award for these initiatives.

Filed the first case under the new Disability Law against a cabinet Minister 

He filed the first-ever case under the new Rights of Persons with Disabilities Act, 2016, which has strict punishment for contravention of provisions of Act, against Satyadev Pachauri for publicly ridiculing a disabled employee. If convicted, Pachauri who is minister of khadi and village industries in the Government of Uttar Pradesh, will faces a six month to five-year prison term.

Withdrawal of Union Public Service Commission and Indian Institutes of Technology Joint Entrance Examinations 'discriminatory proforma 

Singh challenged Union Public Service Commission's format whereby disabled applicants were asked to paste photographs showing their disability as a proof. The Court of Chief Commissioner for Persons with Disabilities directed the UPSC to refrain from asking disabled candidates to submit photographs showing their disabilities and to consider the 'permanent disability certificate' issued from a government hospital as a valid proof. His advocacy led to the withdrawal of similar prOforma by IITJEE

Disabled-friendly websites of Delhi Government hospitals 

His judicial activism led to the web accessibility of all the hospitals under Government of Delhi.

Policy change in duty concession for drivers with disabilities 
Central Government provides excise duty concession to disabled customers however Maruti Suzuki denied him the concession on the pretext of right leg disability which was not only discriminatory but illegal. His relentless fight led the Ministry of Heavy Industries and Public Enterprises to amend the rules and quashing manufacturer's certificate and allowing RTO's certificate only.

Dignified screening of people with disabilities at airports 

After being harassed by security personnel at the Hyderabad airport because of his orthosis, Dr Singh approached Directorate General of Civil Aviation (DGCA) and Bureau of Civil Aviation Security (BCAS) to amend rustic screening procedures and modify guidelines taking Convention on the Rights of Persons with Disabilities into consideration. The disability watchdog has directed both DGCA and BCAS to make sure people with disabilities are not being harassed or humiliated at airports and that security personnel have been sensitized towards them.

Corrected wrong celebration of Salk's birthday on World Polio Day 

Rotary International established World Polio Day (24 October) to commemorate the birthday of virologist Jonas Salk who developed polio vaccine. This erroneous observance was first challenged by Dr Singh in his publication in the official journal of the Edward Jenner Society's Vaccine (journal). Even Google dedicated a doodle on Salk's 100th birthday to confirm 28 October as his birthday. Rotary still celebrates the day on 24 October despite media reporting on the contrary.

His sustained advocacy also lead to ramps being constructed at ATMs. He also raised awareness by highlighting inaccessible ATMs and post offices in the capital to persons with disabilities through Right to Information Act.

Medical Humanities 
Singh and his colleagues documented the medical humanities movement in India. He set up Enabling Unit for persons with disabilities and founded Infinite Ability. These are the first such bodies in any medical college in India. He organised the first ever Theatre of the Oppressed workshop for medical students in India. He was also instrumental in organising a unique 'Blind with Camera' workshop for the visually impaired and blind students of University of Delhi in 2012 with Partho Bhowmick.

Intersex Rights 
Dr. Singh with his other activists - Dr. Aqsa Shaikh and Dr. Sanjay Sharma successfully petitioned Delhi Commission for Protection of Child Rights for recommending to Delhi Government to ban medically unnecessary sex normalisation surgeries on intersex children.

Awards and honours 
National Award by President of India on Election Commission of India's National Voters' Day 2021 
State award by Delhi Election Commission on National Voters Day 2020 on contributing to make the General Elections 2019 inclusive and accessible.
Bucksbaum Institute International Scholar, 2019 at the Bucksbaum Institute for Clinical Excellence at the University of Chicago.
MacLean Center for Clinical Medical Ethics fellowship from University of Chicago in 2019
Mary Glowrey - Liliane Brekelmans Disability Award – 2019 by Catholic Health Association of India and Liliane Foundation, Netherlands.
Henry Viscardi Achievement Awards by the Viscardi center in 2017. 
'Medical Personality of the Year' award by Delhi Medical Association in 2017. 
 State Award by the Government of Delhi for exceptional achievement by a person with disability in the field of social work in 2016. 
NCPEDP MphasiS Universal Design Awards 2013.

References 

Year of birth missing (living people)
Living people
Indian disability rights activists
Indian people with disabilities
People with polio
Medical humanities
Theatre of the Oppressed
20th-century Indian medical doctors
21st-century Indian medical doctors
Indian physiologists
Indian human rights activists
Scientists with disabilities